LGA Architectural Partners (LGA) is an architectural firm based in Toronto, Ontario, Canada, that specializes in creating sustainable, contextually-sensitive and socially-minded architecture. Their diverse portfolio "represents a wide range of building types that are unified in their commitment to strengthening social objectives". The firm, which has been in practice for over 30 years, is known for its socially responsible architecture and "have been leaders in encouraging this approach". They are also known for their work as advocates for social and affordable housing. According to the RAIC's 2019 Architectural Firm Award jury, "Their community-minded approach, combined with innovative design strategies and a sensitivity to sustainability, makes their architecture both aspirational and impressive".

History 
Originally founded as Levitt Goodman Architects in 1989 by Dean Goodman and Janna Levitt, the practice has grown to include additional partners Brock James, Danny Bartman and Alex Tedesco, managing a team of roughly 40 architects and support staff.

Projects

Euclid Avenue House 
Designed in 2005, the Euclid Avenue House in Toronto was Janna Levitt and Dean Goodman's self-commissioned living laboratory from which to explore alternative methodologies to the prevailing trends in Toronto custom homes at the time. The narrow infill house was designed with flexible living spaces and an unusual plan, with a public floor dividing the adult and children's zones, to both maximize useful space, ensure public and private spaces as needed and also prompt its inhabitants to engage more with the city. The house included many novel sustainable features designed to maximize energy consumption including passive ventilation (the house has no air conditioning), strategic use of natural light (which is maximized through glazed walls and a large skylight above the stairwell), and Toronto's first purpose-built residential green roof. The outdoor spaces accommodate various forms of urban agriculture, and the house's lower level was purpose-designed to transition over time from the children's suite to a rental unit.

Eva's Phoenix Brant Street 
Eva's Phoenix is a transitional housing and employment training facility for youth experiencing homelessness in dedication to Eva Smith, an advocate for homeless youth. Eva's required a building that felt safe, while also fostering a sense of community. LGA designed the original Eva's Phoenix in 2000. When plans of converting the building into condominiums emerged, LGA was tasked to design a new space within a portion of the 1932 Art Deco warehouse building adjacent to the Waterworks development. LGA purpose-designed the project to allow newcomers to transition from observing the shelter community's social activity to taking part in it, and giving the residents privacy while also maximizing their safety and security. The plan consists of 10 internal ‘houses’ along a ‘main street’ within a three-storey atrium awash with natural daylight from a new roof composed of skylights. Each "townhouse" consists of a communal kitchen and small living area on the ground floor, and five personal bedrooms above. The shared areas do not have ceilings, to allow for visual openness as well as for daylight from the skylights above. The design required significant negotiations with the building and fire departments, but was finally permitted when LGA proved that it establishes a safer environment that is benefitting of the community. In addition to the residential spaces, a third level above one side of the townhouses offers open meeting spaces for staff and passive “rooftop” surveillance. Ancillary spaces for employment skills such as classrooms, workshops, demonstration kitchens and counselling offices can be found spread amongst the three floors.

Toronto Public Library - Scarborough Civic Centre 
The Scarborough Civic Centre branch, which opened in 2015, is Toronto Public Library's 100th branch. The branch was designed by LGA with Philip H. Carter as planning consultant. The design is known for its unusual, low-slung volume and series of tilted, large-scale glulam columns and beams which breaks from traditional library design by providing a contemporary and friendly environment. The layered wood interior creates a generous, light-filled atrium and brings an abundance of light to the library's stacks and reading rooms. Floor-to-ceiling windows, an outdoor reading garden, and a green roof create links to the surrounding neighbourhood and adjacent parkland. The use of wood also provides a warm counterpoint to the concrete structure of the nearby Scarborough Civic Centre.

McEwen School of Architecture - Laurentian University 
The McEwen School of Architecture at Laurentian University is located in downtown Sudbury. Re-purposing the two existing structures on the site, a campus-like atmosphere was created and allowed for efficient phasing of the project. The site was home to a former Canadian Pacific Railway Ticket and Telegraph Building and a rail shed; along with an angled railway west of the buildings, this informs the overall arrangement of the new additions. Considering the weather of the region, LGA employed the use of both passive and active systems to optimize the school's long-term performance. The second of two new additions is made of cross-laminated timber (CLT), chosen for its sustainability attributes, references to the local forestry industry, and links to northern Ontario Indigenous peoples. Made of 550 cubic meters of wood, at the time of construction it was the first major CLT building in Ontario. Doubling as a teaching opportunity, a conscious choice of exposing structural, mechanical and electrical systems facilitates the instructional role of the school. The school was completed in 2016 and opened January 2017.

Stackt Shipping Container Market 
Temporarily inhabiting the site of a former smelting plant, Stackt Market is an all-season public market made out of 120 shipping containers. The market occupies a 2.5 acre patch of formerly vacant land owned by the City of Toronto at Front and Bathurst. Inspired by the shipping containers markets in the United Kingdom, Toronto entrepreneur Matt Rubinoff founded Stackt Market in 2014. Following research of retrofitted shipping container precedents in the city, he contacted LGA to design and masterplan the site. After five years of development, Stackt Market opened April 10 of 2019. Within the site, a main street stretches from the primary entrance, connecting to a series of courtyards, side streets and laneways. Containers at grade were retrofitted and occupied by pop-ups, creative incubators and retailers. Individual retail containers were designed with a kit-of-parts strategy to allow for future deployment. Larger units are composed of multiple modules combined. Food and beverage shops surround a south facing courtyard and large lawn providing sunlight and views into an active rail corridor. Additional reclaimed containers were built up to create the second or third storeys, and stacked in random fashion to create an “industrial-cool aesthetic” and provide opportunities for street art.

Awards 
LGA has received several awards for design excellence including a Governor Generals Medal in Architecture and a RAIC Award of Excellence for Innovation. In 2019, the firm received the Architectural Firm Award from the RAIC. Their projects have been recognized by the OAA awards, Toronto Urban Design Awards, Ontario WoodWorks! and the Canadian Wood Council, among others.

External links 

 ArchDaily 
Architectural Record 
Canadian Architect 
 Designlines Magazine 
Dezeen 
The Globe and Mail 
WoodWORKS

References 

Architecture firms of Canada
Companies based in Toronto